= Franklinian =

Franklinian may refer to:

== Stratigraphy ==
- Franklinian (stage) - an Eocene North American plant fossil stage.

== Name ==
- Benjamin Franklin - referring to Benjamin Franklin
